Robert H. Von Schlick (January 2, 1875 – July 1, 1941) was a German-born United States Army private who received the Medal of Honor for actions during the Boxer Rebellion.

Career
Von Schlick (name misspelled as Vonshlick on army records) joined the army from San Francisco in July 1899, and was discharged for disability in October 1900. During a battle on July 13, 1900, in Tientsin, China, Von Schlick rescued a wounded comrade despite his own wounds and then remained alone at a dike returning enemy fire.

Death
Von Schlick died at the age of 66, roughly 41 years after earning the Medal of Honor. He is buried in Los Angeles National Cemetery, Los Angeles, California. His grave can be found in section 81, row G, grave 20.

Medal of Honor
The President of the United States in the name of The Congress takes pleasure in presenting the Medal of Honor to

Citation:

The President of the United States of America, in the name of Congress, takes pleasure in presenting the Medal of Honor to Private Robert H. Von Schlick, United States Army, for gallantry in action on 13 July 1900, while serving with Company C, 9th Infantry, at Tientsin, China. Although previously wounded while carrying a wounded comrade to a place of safety, Private Von Schlick rejoined his command, which partly occupied an exposed position upon a dike, remaining there after his command had been withdrawn, singly keeping up the fire, and obliviously presenting himself as a conspicuous target until he was literally shot off his position by the enemy.

See also

List of Medal of Honor recipients

Notes

References

 

1875 births
1941 deaths
United States Army Medal of Honor recipients
German emigrants to the United States
United States Army soldiers
American military personnel of the Boxer Rebellion
German-born Medal of Honor recipients
Boxer Rebellion recipients of the Medal of Honor
Burials at Los Angeles National Cemetery
Military personnel from Berlin